Bhokar is a town,  tehsil, municipal council and subdivision of Nanded district  in the Indian state of Maharashtra.

Demographics
 2011 census, Bhokar had a population of 32,899. The Municipal Council had a gender ratio of 924 females per 1,000 males. 12.4 percent of the population were under six years old. Effective literacy was 87.40 percent. 81.74 percent of women were literate. Male literacy was 92.68 percent.

See also
 Bhokar (Vidhan Sabha constituency)

References

Cities and towns in Nanded district
Talukas in Maharashtra